Dr. Vineetha Wijesuriya (born 1970) is an Australian female chess player born in Sri Lanka and two time best female chess player in Australia, who lives in Melbourne, Australia. She is an eleven time National Chess Champion from 1989 to 2008.She become the third place from world varsity chess championship in Malayasia and representing Sri Lanka for 29 international chess events and Australia for five international chess events.

She is the sister of  Sri Lankan chess player, Suneetha Wijesuriya. She began playing at the age of nine, after her sister Suneetha won a chess set in a competition. She is nicknamed "the Chess Queen of Sri Lanka".
Vineetha was a student of Gothatuwa Maha Vidyalaya and Buddhist Ladies College, Colombo 7.
Vineetha Wijesuriya has also represented Australia in chess championships. She was the winner of the 2014 Oceania Chess Championship in the women's category.

References

External links 
 
 
 
 Profile at Chessdb

1970 births
Living people
Sri Lankan female chess players
Australian female chess players
Australian people of Sri Lankan descent